Birutė Užkuraitytė (born 22 February 1953) is a Lithuanian swimmer. She competed for the Soviet Union at the 1972 Summer Olympics in the 200 m and 400 m individual medley events, but did not reach the finals.

She won two Soviet titles in 1972–73, and a bronze medal at the 1973 Summer Universiade in the 200 m medley. Since 1988 she competes in the masters category, under her married name Statkevičienė.

References

1953 births
Living people
Soviet female medley swimmers
Lithuanian female medley swimmers
Swimmers at the 1972 Summer Olympics
Olympic swimmers of the Soviet Union
Universiade medalists in swimming
Sportspeople from Kaunas
Universiade bronze medalists for the Soviet Union
Medalists at the 1973 Summer Universiade